Kanichi Yamamoto (1879–1961) was the first Japanese Baháʼí. He joined the religion in 1902. Some of his children also decided to join the Baháʼí Faith. Of Yamamoto, who heard of the Baháʼí Faith in Honolulu, ʻAbdu'l-Baha said,

"thou...art the single one of Japan and the unique one of the extreme Orient."

Yamamoto remained a staunch and ardent Baha'i until his death in 1961.

See also

Baháʼí Faith in Japan

References

Japan Will Turn Ablaze!
Traces that Remain
Major events of the Century of Light Prepared by Dr. Ahmadi
Memories of ʹAbduʹl-Bahá: recollections of the early days of the Baháʹí faith in California

Japanese Bahá'ís
1879 births
1961 deaths
Converts to the Bahá'í Faith
20th-century Bahá'ís